The 2010 ARFU Women's Rugby Championship was the fourth edition of the tournament. It was played between Japan and Hong Kong on 22 April at the Prince Chichibu Memorial Stadium in Tokyo. However, some sources suggest that the match was the ARFU Division 1 XV Championship.

The ARFU also put together a development competition. These were not test matches and lasted 40 minutes. There were only three countries competing: Laos, Thailand, and the Philippines.

ARFU Women's Rugby Championship

ARFU Development Cup

References 

2010 in Asian rugby union
2010 in women's rugby union
Asia Rugby Women's Championship
Rugby union in Hong Kong
Rugby union in Japan
Asia Rugby
Asia Rugby
Asia Rugby Women's Championship